14 Karat Soul is an a cappella group from East Orange, New Jersey. They began their active career in the 1980s. 14 Karat Soul were originally a strictly doo-wop group, but later branched out into other genres. They were featured in the 1980 Mabou Mines short film Sister Suzie Cinema, a 20-minute doo-wop opera by Bob Telson and Lee Breuer. 14 Karat Soul also appeared on Saturday Night Live, Sesame Street, and Between the Lions.

Discography
The discography of 14 Karat Soul includes several albums and compilations on Pony Canyon for the Japanese market, where the group was known through numerous Japanese TV adverts.
Lovers' Fantasy  
Sister Suzie Cinema & The Gospel at Colonus (with Ben Halley Jr.)  
Have Fun Tonight  
Too Young: 14 Greatest Ballads
Take Me Back 
On The Road Again
Ole Skool Soul
Songs From The Heart 
The Girl in White
Transpacific
Get Back In Love
That's Doo-Wop Acappella 
In Love With You 
14 Karat Soul Sings Disney
Mo' Disney, Mo' 14 Karat Soul
Imagine
Sesame Street: Sing-Along Travel Songs

References

Musical groups from New Jersey
Musicians from East Orange, New Jersey
A cappella musical groups